The PSE All Shares Index is the stock index in the Philippine Stock Exchange in which all of the stocks traded are included in computations for the level of the index.

List of stocks

0-9
 2GO Group
 8990 Holdings, Inc.

A
 A. Brown Company
 A. Soriano Corporation
 Abacus Consolidated Resources & Holdings
 Aboitiz Equity Ventures
 Aboitiz Power Corporation
 Aboitiz Transport System Corporation
 Abra Mining & Industrial Corporation
 ABS-CBN Corporation
 Acesite (Philippines) Hotel Corporation
 Active Alliance
 AGP Industrial Corporation
 Ajo.Net Holdings
 Alcorn Gold Resources Corporation
 Allhome Corp.
 Alliance Global Group
 Alliance Tuna International
 Alsons Consolidated Resources
 Anchor Land Holdings
 Anglo Philippine Holdings Corporation
 APC Group
 Apex Mining Company
 Araneta Properties
 Aries Prime Resources
 Asia Amalgamated Holdings
 Asian Terminals
 Asiatrust Development Bank
 Atlas Consolidated Mining & Development Corporation
 ATN Holdings
 Atok-Big Wedge Company
 ATR Kimeng Financial Corporation
 Ayala Corporation
 Ayala Land
 Axelum Resources Corp.

B
 Bacnotan Consolidated Industrial
 Banco de Oro Unibank, Inc.
 Banco Filipino Savings and Mortgage Bank
 Bank of the Philippine Islands
 Bankard
 Basic Energy Corporation
 Belle Corporation
 Benguet Corporation
 Benpres Holdings
 BHI Holdings
 Bogo Medellin Milling Company
 Boulevard Holdings

C
 CADP Group Corporation
 Cebu Pacific
 Cebu Holdings
 Cebu Property Venture & Development
 Central Azucarera De Tarlac
 Centro Escolar University
 Century Pacific Food
 Century Properties
 Chemical Industries of the Philippines
 Chemrez Technologies
 China Banking Corporation
 Chinatrust (Philippines) Commercial Bank Corporation
 Citiseconline.Com
 City & Land Developers
 City Resources (Philippines) Corporation
 Cityland Development Corporation
 Citystate Savings Bank
 Concepcion Industries
 Concrete Aggregates Corporation
 Crown Equities
 Cyber Bay Corporation

D
 D&L Industries, Inc.
 Del Monte Pacific
 Dito CME Holdings Corporation
 DFNN Inc.
 Dizon Copper Silver Mines
 DMCI Holdings
 DM Wenceslao & Associates, Incorporated

E
 East Asia Power Resources Corporation
 Easycall Communications Phils.
 EEI Corporation
 EIB Realty Development
 Empire East Land Holdings
 Eton Properties Philippines
 Euro-Med Laboratories Phils.
 Ever Gotesco Resources & Holdings
 Export and Industry Bank

F
 F & J Prince Holdings Corporation
 Far Eastern University
 Federal Resources Investment Group
 Fil-Estate Corporation
 Fil-Estate Land
 Filinvest Development Corporation
 Filinvest Land
 Filipino Fund
 Filsyn Corporation
 First Abacus Financial Holdings Corp.
 First Gen Corporation
 First Metro Investment Corporation
 First Philippine Holdings Corporation
 Figaro Coffee
 Forum Pacific
 Fruitas Holdings, Inc.

G
 Geograce Resources Philippines
 Ginebra San Miguel
 Globalport 900, Inc. ({{Pse|PORT})
 Globe Telecom
 GMA Network 
 Grand Plaza Hotel Corporation

H
 Holcim Philippines
 House of Investments

I
 Imperial Resources
 International Container Terminal Services Inc.
 Interport Resources Corporation
 Ionics
 iPeople
 IPM Holdings Inc.
 I-Remit
 Island Information and Technology
 Ism Communications Corporation
 Ivantage Corporation

J
 JG Summit Holdings
 Jollibee Foods Corporation
 Jolliville Holdings Corporation
 Jth Davies Holdings

K
 The Keepers Holdings Inc.
 Keppel Philippine Holdings
 Keppel Philippines Properties
 Kepwealth Property Phils. Inc

L
 LBC Express
 Leisure & Resorts World Corporation
 Lepanto Consolidated Mining Company
 Liberty Flour Mills
 Liberty Telecoms Holdings
 LMG Chemicals Corporation
 Lodestar Investment Holdings Corporation
 Lorenzo Shipping Corporation

M
 Mabuhay Holdings Corporation
 Mabuhay Vinyl Corporation
 Macondray Plastics
 MacroAsia Corporation
 Manila Broadcasting Company
 Manila Bulletin Publishing Corporation
 Manila Electric Company
 Manila Jockey Club
 Manila Mining Corporation
 Manila Water
 Manulife Financial Corporation
 Marsteel Consolidated 
 Max's Group
 Medco Holdings
 Megaworld Corporation
 MerryMart Consumer Corp. 
 Metro Alliance Holdings & Equities Corp.
 Metro Pacific Investments Corporation
 Metropolitan Bank & Trust Company
 Millennium Global Holdings, Inc. 
 Monde Nissin Corporation
 Mondragon International Philippines
 MRC Allied Industries
 Music Semiconductors Corporation

N
 National Reinsurance Corporation of the Philippines
 Nextstage
 Nihao Mineral Resources International

O
 Omico Corporation
 Oriental Petroleum & Mineral Corporation

P
 Pacific Online Systems Corporation
 Pacifica, Inc.
 PAL Holdings
 Panasonic Manufacturing Philippines Corporation* Paxys
 PCI Leasing and Finance
 Petroenergy Resources Corporation
 Petron Corporation
 Philcomsat Holdings Corporation
 Philex Mining Corporation
 Philippine Bank of Communications
 Philippine Estates Corporation
 Philippine Long Distance Telephone Company
 Philippine National Bank
 Philippine National Construction Corporation
 Philippine Racing Club
 Philippine Realty and Holdings Corporation
 Philippine Savings Bank
 Philippine Seven Corporation
 Philippine Stock Exchange
 Philippine Telegraph and Telephone Corporation
 Philippine Tobacco Flue-Curing and Redrying Corp.
 Philippine Trust Company
 Philweb Corporation
 Phoenix Petroleum Philippines, Inc.
 Picop Resources
 Pilipino Telephone Corporation
 PNOC Energy Development Corporation
 PNOC Exploration Corporation
 Polar Property Holdings Corporation
 Premiere Entertainment Productions
 Prime Gaming Philippines
 Prime Media Holdings
 Prime Orion Philippines
 Primetown Property Group
 Primex Corporation
 Pryce Corporation

R
 Republic Cement Corporation
 Republic Glass Holdings Corporation
 RFM Corporation
 Rizal Commercial Banking Corporation
 Robinsons Land Corporation
 Roxas Holdings

S
 San Miguel Corporation
 San Miguel Properties
 San Miguel Food and Beverage
 Sanitary Wares Manufacturing Corporation
 Seafront Resources Corporation
 Security Bank Corporation
 Semirara Mining Corporation
 Shang Properties
 Shakey's Asia Ventures Inc.
 Sinophil Corporation
 SM Development Corporation
 SM Investments Corporation
 SM Prime Holdings
 Solid Group
 South China Resources
 Southeast Asia Cement Holdings
 SPC Power Corporation
 Sta. Lucia Land
 STI Education Systems Holdings
 Steniel Manufacturing Corporation
 Sun Life Financial Inc.
 Suntrust Home Developers
 Supercity Realty Development Corporation
 Swift Foods
 Synergy Grid and Development Philippines Inc.

T
 Tanduay Holdings
 Philippine Stock Exchange
 The Philodrill Corporation
 Trans-Asia Oil And Energy Development Corp.
 Transpacific Broadband Group International

U
 Unioil Resources & Holdings Company
 Union Bank of the Philippines
 United Paragon Mining Corporation
 Universal Rightfield Property Holdings
 Universal Robina Corporation
 Uniwide Holdings

V
 Victorias Milling Company
 Vista Land and Lifescapes, Inc.
 Vitarich Corporation
 Vivant Corporation
 Vulcan Industrial & Mining

W
 Waterfront Philippines
 Wellex Industries
 Wilcon Depot

Z
 Zeus Holdings

Former Members
 Alaska Milk Corporation (AMC)
 Cosmos Bottling Corporation (CBC)
 Gotesco Land (GO)
 Highlands Prime (HP)
 Interphil Laboratories (ILIB)
 Keppel Philippines Marine (KPM)
 Splash Corporation (SPH)
 Wise Holdings (WHI/WHIB)
 Wyeth Philippines, Inc. (WYE)

References
All Shares Index at the PSE official website

External links
Bloomberg page for PASHR:IND

Philippine stock market indices